is a song recorded by Japanese singer-songwriter Miliyah Kato for her debut album Rose. It was released as the album's third single on March 24, 2005. "Dear Lonely Girl" is considered an answer song to ECD's "ECD no Lonely Girl", from which it samples its structure. Both songs sample the melody of Marvin Gaye's "Sexual Healing" and the hook of idol singer Yuri Satō's "Lonely Girl" (1983), which became the chorus of Kato's song.

The hook of Kato's "Dear Lonely Girl" involves her shouting out various feminine given names. These names are lifted from both Kato's real life, including the names of members of her entourage, and from fiction, namely character names from the premier cell phone novel series Deep Love.

Kato's song "Lipstick" (2015) was written from the perspective of the same protagonist, but ten years later. In 2017, Kato released the song "Shinyaku Dear Lonely Girl"  featuring ECD, in which she samples "Dear Lonely Girl".

Track listing

CD single

Charts

References

2005 singles
2005 songs
Miliyah Kato songs
Mastersix Foundation singles
Songs written by Marvin Gaye
Songs written by Odell Brown